David Griffiths (born 1950, Auckland, New Zealand) is a composer, baritone and convener of the Conservatorium of Music at the University of Waikato. Griffiths has gained national and international recognition as a composer, opera singer and recital soloist.  His choral compositions are particularly popular in the United States of America and have, in recent years, been recorded by several choirs while many works have been included on various record labels including Naxos Records, Kiwi Pacific and Atoll.

Griffiths has performed as a soloist with the New Zealand Symphony Orchestra, Auckland Philharmonia Orchestra, all major choral societies in New Zealand and regularly with NBR New Zealand Opera. He has also performed as a recital soloist, representing New Zealand in Taiwan, the US, the United Kingdom and Europe.

Griffiths works as a freelance composer and is fully represented by SouNZ Aotearoa, the Center for New Zealand Music.  He has held positions of lecturer and senior lecturer in voice at universities throughout New Zealand and as such has trained singers who have gone on to perform with distinguished companies such as the Cologne Opera and The Bayreuth Chorus.

Biography
David Griffiths was born 1950 in Auckland, and completed his schooling at Westlake Boys High School. He graduated in 1971 from the University of Auckland with a Bachelor of Music and studied composition at the Guildhall School of Music in London in 1972. Griffiths was awarded a Master of Music degree (1st class honours) in composition in 1973. Since that time he has worked as a freelance composer, operatic and recital singer and lecturer in voice, based primarily in Auckland.  He returned to the UK and Europe, after the completion of the MMus, where he was a member of various ensembles including the BBC Singers.

Griffiths, on his return to New Zealand, won both of New Zealand's premier operatic competitions, the NZ Herald Aria (currently the New Zealand Aria) and the 1983 Mobil Song Quest (currently the Lexus Song Quest). He has held appointments as Lecturer of Voice and Senior Lecturer at the University of Auckland through much of his career except from 1986 until 1992 where he held the same at the University of Otago and since his appointment at the University of Waikato.  He is the current convener of the Conservatorium of Music at the University of Waikato, Hamilton and senior lecturer of voice. In 2006, Griffiths became a founding member of the New Zealand Chamber Soloists with whom he has worked in a capacity as both composer and singer.

Activities

Composing
Griffiths is recognised as one of New Zealand's leading composers and as such is fully represented by SouNZ Aotearoa, the Centre for New Zealand Music.  SouNZ has on record eighty-six published works by Griffiths including choral music, song cycles, songs, opera, piano music and chamber music for a variety of instruments. He has written commissions for numerous musicians and groups including the Karlheinz Company and the New Zealand Chamber Soloists and has received official support for compositional projects through Creative New Zealand.

Griffiths has gained a particular reputation as a choral composer with choral works being performed by choirs around the world and several recordings made by choirs in the United States of America. The "Te Deum Laudamus" was commissioned by award winning, Seattle based vocal ensemble, Opus 7 for their 10th anniversary celebrations in 2002.  Other notable works include, "The Servant", for choir, soloist and two string quartets and operas, "The Woman from Moab", based on the biblical book of Ruth and "The White Lady".

Griffiths frequently draws on existing texts for his songs.  Many of these have been of an original New Zealand setting, such as "Six Watercolours".  This work, originally commissioned by John Rimmer, consists of six art songs with poetry inspired by the paintings of Doris Lusk.  They describe some of the untouched landscapes along the New Zealand coast.  Other texts are drawn from original traditional Latin liturgical texts and a variety of sources as exhibited in the collected CD of his early art songs, "Charms and Knots".

Performing
Griffiths has performed frequently with New Zealand Opera, all major choral societies in New Zealand, the Auckland Philharmonia Orchestra and the New Zealand Symphony Orchestra. He performs an extensive baritone repertoire of opera and oratorio and recital tours have taken him to the United Kingdom, Europe the US and Taiwan.

His operatic repertoire has included La Traviata, Madama Butterfly, The Magic Flute, Tosca, Gianni Schicchi, Salome, Der Rosenkavalier, Don Pasquale, The Pearl Fishers, Macbeth, Cenerentola, Die Fledermaus, Julius Caesar, Così fan tutte, Zaida and Galileo.  As a concert soloist, Griffiths has performed all the major works of J S Bach, the War Requiem by Benjamin Britten, Elgar's The Dream of Gerontius, Elijah by Felix Mendelssohn, The Light in the Wilderness by Dave Brubeck, Monteverdi's Solemn Vespers, Vaughan Williams' Five Mystical Songs, The Messiah by Handel and Carmina Burana by Carl Orff.

Griffiths has also premiered numerous New Zealand works such as Orpheus in Rarohenga by John Psathas with the NZSO and performed with well-known New Zealand singers such as Sir Donald McIntyre, Malvina Major, Anna Leese and Helen Medlyn.

Recording
Griffiths has recorded much of the English, German and French Art Song repertoire for Concert FM as well as a significant body of New Zealand music.  CD recordings as a soloist have included works such as Prodigal Country with the New Zealand Symphony Orchestra under the direction of the late Sir Charles Groves and the Five Mystical Songs under Karen Grylls, director of the Dorian Choir and songs by with David Farquhar.

Ahi a CD collaboration between the Ogen Trio and the New Zealand Chamber Soloists featured works by Griffiths and four other leading New Zealand composers, Michael Williams, Gareth Farr, Martin Lodge and John Psathas. Griffiths has recorded CDs and DVDs for Naxos Records including "Missa Solemnis, Te Deum" with the New Zealand Symphony Orchestra and Tower Voices NZNaxos Records as well as Kiwi Pacific Records, Herald Record Label and Ode Records.

Teaching
Griffiths has held positions of Lecturer of Voice and Senior Lecturer of voice at the University of Auckland, University of Otago and University of Waikato.  He is the current convener of the Conservatorium of Music, University of Waikato.

Selected works
A more complete list of works can be found at SouNZ Centre for New Zealand Music

 Beata Virgo for 12 part (SSSAAATTTBBB) choir
 Cosmic Praise for SATB choir and SATB soloists
 Dormi Jesu for SATB choir
 Five Landscapes for SATB choir
 Five Love Songs for tenor and piano
 Four Tudor Anthems for SATB choir
 Lie Deep, My Love a cycle of three settings of poems by James K. Baxter for SATB choir and soloists	
 Salve Regina for double SATB choir
 Six Legs or More for piano
 Sonata for horn and piano
 Sonata in C for piano
 St Barnabas Liturgy Parish Communion setting
 Stabat Mater for SATB choir and organ
 Sun Shower and other pieces for piano
 Three Canons for piano
 Three Franks Opera
 The White Lady Opera
 Mary Muller – The Secret Suffragette Opera
 Walls of Troy Opera

References

External links
 Chamber Music New Zealand
 Creative New Zealand
 SouNZ Center for New Zealand Music
 University of Waikato: Conservatorium of Music

1950 births
Living people
New Zealand composers
Male composers
New Zealand classical musicians
20th-century New Zealand male opera singers
New Zealand baritones
21st-century New Zealand male opera singers
Musicians from Auckland